José María "Joey" Fernández Zubiri III (born April 30, 1963), commonly known as Jose Ma. Zubiri III or simply Jose Zubiri III, is a Filipino politician. He served as a Member of the House of Representatives of the Philippines, representing the Third District of Bukidnon from 2007 to 2016.

Biography
Joey Zubiri was born in the City of Manila, Philippines and raised in the province of Bukidnon to a Negrense father Jose Ma. Rubin Zubiri, Jr., Bukidnon's Provincial Governor who hails from Kabankalan, Negros Occidental, and a Bicolana mother Ma. Victoria Fernandez who was raised in Bukidnon. He speaks Cebuano, Tagalog, English, Spanish and his father's native Hiligaynon. His family is of Basque Spanish heritage.

He was preceded in his seat by his brother, Senator Juan Miguel Zubiri, and his father, Jose Zubiri, Jr.

Ancestors

References
 

People from Bukidnon
1963 births
Living people
Filipino people of Spanish descent
Members of the House of Representatives of the Philippines from Bukidnon